Kellits is a settlement in Jamaica. It has a population of 2,658 as of 2009.

Kellits may take its name from the landholding of Moses Kellet, assembly man for the parish of Clarendon in the 1750s, although records give even earlier reference to a George Kellet of Clarendon and his son Henry, born in 1698.

References

Populated places in Clarendon Parish, Jamaica